For the Islamic concept of Jihad-e-Akbar (The Greater Struggle), see:

 Jihad-e-Akbar in mainstream Islam
 Jihad-e-Akbar in Ismailism